East Staffordshire is a local government district with borough status in Staffordshire, England.  It has two main towns: Burton upon Trent and Uttoxeter.

Villages in the area include Abbots Bromley, Stretton, Tutbury, Barton-under-Needwood, Rolleston on Dove, Hanbury, Kingstone, Marchington, Mayfield and The Heath.

The district was formed on 1 April 1974 by the merger of the former county borough of Burton upon Trent with the Urban District of Uttoxeter, and the Rural Districts of Tutbury and Uttoxeter. It received borough status in 1992.

Since 2011, East Staffordshire has formed part of the Greater Birmingham & Solihull Local Enterprise Partnership along with neighbouring authorities Birmingham, Bromsgrove, Cannock Chase, Lichfield, Redditch, Solihull, Tamworth and Wyre Forest.
In 2020, East Staffordshire also joined Stoke & Staffs Local Enterprise Partnership joining Staffordshire Moorlands District Council, Newcastle-under-Lyme Borough Council, Stoke-on-Trent City Council, Stafford Borough Council, Tamworth Borough Council, Lichfield District Council, Cannock Chase District Council and South Staffordshire District Council.

Wards within East Staffordshire
There are 39 councillors representing 21 wards in East Staffordshire. Most wards have either one or two councillors, but a few have three. The number of councillors is loosely based on the population size in that area.

Political makeup

As of June 2021, East Staffordshire is controlled by the Conservative party. The Conservative party have 24 councillors, the Labour party have 11 councillors, the Liberal Democrats have one councillor and there are 3 Independent Councillors.

As of 21 March 2022 the Leader of the council is Cllr George Allen. He is also both the second and consecutive Uttoxeter councillor to lead the council since formation in 1972.

Since 22 May 2015 the Leader of the Opposition is Cllr Michael Fitzpatrick.

There are three groups which each have their share of committee seats. The Conservative group, the Labour group and the Independent Alliance group made up of one Libdem and three Independents.

Transport
Main roads within the Borough include the A38 through Burton upon Trent and the A50 near Uttoxeter.

There are two railway stations in the Borough, Burton-on-Trent on the Cross Country Route and Uttoxeter on the Crewe to Derby Line, There is also a station serving Tutbury, also on the Crewe to Derby Line called Tutbury and Hatton. This is in the South Derbyshire district.

See also
Grade II* listed buildings in East Staffordshire

References

External links
 East Staffordshire borough council website
 Enjoy East Staffordshire
 Flickr photos of East Staffordshire

 
Non-metropolitan districts of Staffordshire
Boroughs in England